Buluggin ibn Ziri, often transliterated Bologhine, in full ʾAbū al Futūḥ Sayf ad Dawlah Bulukīn ibn Zīrī ibn Manād aṣ Ṣanhājī (died 984) was the first ruler of the Sanhaja Berber dynasty of Zirids in Ifriqiya (972–984).

Bologhine, a suburb in the city of Algiers, is named after him.

Biography 
Buluggin was born in the region of Titteri, in what is now Algeria. While his father Ziri ibn Menad was emir of the central Maghreb, Buluggin ibn Ziri founded the city of Algiers on the site of the ancient Roman Icosium in 960, but also Médéa and Miliana. He also rebuilt the villages destroyed by the various revolts.

On the death of his father, in a battle against Kharidjite Berber tribes in 971, the Fatimid Caliph Al-Mu'izz li-Din Allah appointed Buluggin ibn Ziri as Emir of the Maghreb. In addition to the attributions of his father Menad Abu Ziri, he received the regions of Zab and M'Sila that the defector Jaʿfar ibn ʿAlī ruled. The honours bestowed on him would provoke the jealousy of the Kutamas. Al-Mu'izz li-Din Allah left the governance of Sicily and Tripoli to members of his family.

Buluggin continued the fight against the Zenatas. The Maghrawa asked for the help of the Umayyads of Cordoba to take back their territory and their cities. Buluggin then took control of almost all of the Maghreb under orders of the Fatimid Caliph. Buluggin defeated the Maghrawa, the Hawwaras (branch of the Branis), the Nefzawas (branch of the Zenatas) and the Mazata. The prisoners were resettled in great numbers in the settlement of Ashir.

The Fatimids transferred their court from Mahdia to Cairo. Buluggin was then appointed viceroy of Ifriqiya with Kairouan as its capital.  The Fatimids had taken the treasury and fleet with them to Egypt, so the first priority of the Zirid government was to consolidate its rule. However, the loss of the fleet meant loss of control over the Kalbids in Sicily. Buluggin took Fez, Sijilmasa and most of Morocco to the Atlantic coast. During a campaign in Morocco, he fought against the Bargawata. The Caliphate of Córdoba was, however, able to retain the fortresses of Ceuta and Tangiers. Nevertheless, Buluggin remained a vassal of the Fatimids, to whom he had to pay tribute, and he remained surrounded by advisors who were there to support him as much as to watch over him. The Fatimids took with them wealth and military equipment. The absolute priority of the Zirids was therefore to strengthen their power, but the displacement of the Fatimid fleet towards Egypt made the conservation of the Kalbide territories in Sicily impossible.

Bologhine Ziri received from the Caliph the titles of Abu al-Futuh, "Father of Victories" and Sayf ad-Dawla "Sword of Empire". In 977, Abu Mansur Nizar al-Aziz Billah, the successor of Al-Muizz li-Dîn Allah, attributed to Bologhine the cities of Tripoli, Ajdabiya and Sirte in addition to his previous attributions. He conquers Fez, Sijilmassa and but stopped before Ceuta. When he saw the square, which he considered impregnable, and the reinforcements of the Zenatas coming from Andalusia by sea, he turned back. He punished the sovereign of the Barghawata, who was declared prophet, in an expedition in 979 in which he brought back a large number of Moroccan slaves; while his lieutenant paraded them in the streets the people of Ifriqiya were shocked as they had never seen such a large number of slaves before.

Little is known about the personal life of Buluggin however chroniclers state that he had many women around him and that prior to his rule of the Maghreb he had 400 concubines and one day he received the good tidings of the birth of seventeen children.

In May 984, Bologhine died, and his son Al-Mansur succeeded him in all his attributions.

References

984 deaths
10th-century Berber people
10th-century people from the Fatimid Caliphate
10th-century rulers in Africa
Vassal rulers of the Fatimid Caliphate
Sanhaja
Year of birth unknown
Zirid emirs of Ifriqiya
City founders
10th-century people of Ifriqiya